Captain Harold Thomas Mellings  was a British World War I flying ace credited with 15 aerial victories.

Early life and career
Mellings was granted Royal Aero Club Aviators' Certificate No. 2028 at the Beatty Flying School in Hendon on a Caudron biplane on 11 November 1915, having  joined the Royal Naval Air Service as a temporary probationary flight sub-lieutenant, and was confirmed in his rank on 3 April 1916.

Service on the Aegean Front
Mellings began his career as a fighter ace on 30 September 1916, when he flew a Bristol Scout to victory over an LVG near Smyrna. He sent the observation plane spinning down out of control. It would be exactly a year until victory number two, by which time he had been promoted to flight lieutenant (June 1917). This second action was a clash between polyglot forces. Mellings was flying a recently rebuilt Sopwith Triplane equipped with an extra gun, and was accompanied by John Alcock in a Sopwith Camel and a third pilot in a Sopwith Pup. The opposing Germans were a two-seater observation plane escorted by two Albatros W.4s. The ensuing dogfight resulted in Mellings shooting away the upper left wing of Walter Kreuger's W.4; Kreuger crashed into the Aegean Sea. In November, Mellings destroyed enemy aircraft on the 19th, 25th, and 29th, becoming an ace while still flying Sopwith Triplane No. N5431. Soon afterwards, he was transferred out of No. 2 Wing to No. 10 Naval Squadron on the Western Front in France.

Service on the Western Front
Mellings's new assignment put him in the cockpit of a Sopwith Camel. He used it to score his sixth triumph on 28 February 1918. He tallied four more wins in March, including a double victory on 24 March, to become a double ace. After one more win, on 9 April, he was wounded in action on the 15th. He would not score again until 9 July 1918. He then notched two victories each on 20 and 22 July. Later in the day of the 22nd, he was killed in action by Ludwig Beckmann.

Mellings's final tally was ten enemy aeroplanes confirmed destroyed, five driven down out of control, and two unconfirmed victories.

He is buried in  Ramscappelle Road Military Cemetery, Nieuwpoort, Belgium.

Honours and awards
Distinguished Service Cross
Flight Sub-Lieutenant Harold Thomas Mellings, RNAS.
"In recognition of his services on 19 March 1917, when he attacked a hostile aeroplane with great gallantry at heights varying from 12,000 to 2,000 feet."

Bar to the Distinguished Service Cross
Flight Lieutenant Harold Thomas Mellings, DSC, RNAS.
"For the great skill, judgment and dash displayed by him off Mudros on 30 September 1917, in a successful attack on three enemy seaplanes, two of which were brought down in the sea."
 
Distinguished Flying Cross 
Lieutenant (Honorary Captain) Harold Thomas Mellings, DSC. (Sea Patrol).
"A very gallant officer who, on a recent patrol, attacked and caused to crash an enemy two-seater. Later, on the same patrol, he was attacked by four Fokkers, one of which he shot down at a range of ten yards; this machine was seen to crash. A second was driven down smoking. Since he was awarded a Bar to the Distinguished Service Cross Captain Mellings has, in addition to the above, accounted for eleven enemy machines—seven destroyed, and four driven down out of control."

Mellings was also awarded the Silver War Medal by Greece on 21 September 1916.

References

Bibliography
 
 

1899 births
1918 deaths
British World War I flying aces
Royal Naval Air Service aviators
Recipients of the Distinguished Service Cross (United Kingdom)
British military personnel killed in World War I
Military personnel from Shropshire
Recipients of the Distinguished Flying Cross (United Kingdom)
Burials at Ramscappelle Road Military Cemetery